Mahmoud Vaezi (born 22 May 1952) is an Iranian engineer, politician and former diplomat. He was minister of communication from 2013 until 2017 and chief of staff of the president of Iran from 2017 to 2021.

He obtained B.S. and M.S. in degrees in electrical engineering from Sacramento State University and San Jose State University and was PhD student in telecommunications engineering at Louisiana State University, which he left unfinished. He holds M.A. and PhD in international relations from Tehran and Warsaw Universities, respectively.

He was Deputy of Foreign Policy and International Relations position at Center for Strategic Research, from 1999 to 2013. He was managing director and chairman of the board of directors of Telecommunication Company of Iran and also the first deputy minister of post and telecommunication from 1980 to 1987. From 1990 to 1997, he was political deputy of foreign minister in Europe and American countries affairs. He was deputy foreign minister of Iran in Europe and American countries affairs before and an adviser to Hassan Rouhani in his 2013 presidential campaign and was considered a potential foreign minister in his first government, but he was nominated for the communication ministry. He was announced on 26 July 2017 that he will not continued as communication minister in Rouhani's second cabinet. On 20 August 2017, he was named as Chief of Staff of the President of Iran.

During his tenure at foreign ministry, he played role in signing Tehran Communiqué which aimed at finding a peaceful solution to the Karabakh dispute.

References

External links
Profile at Center for Strategic Research

External links

San Jose State University alumni
Iranian diplomats
1952 births
Living people
Moderation and Development Party politicians
Communications ministers